Oopiri | Thozha  is a 2016 Indian comedy-drama film directed by Vamshi Paidipally, and produced by PVP Cinema. The film stars Akkineni Nagarjuna, Karthi and Tamannaah while Prakash Raj, Vivek, Ali, Jayasudha, Kalpana, Tanikella Bharani and Manobala play supporting roles. Karthi debuts in Telugu cinema through this film. The film focuses on the lives of Vikramaditya, a quadriplegic billionaire, and Seenu, his ex-convict caretaker. Their realisation of the primacy of life and relationships over money and disability forms the major part of its story.

A remake of Olivier Nakache & Éric Toledano French film The Intouchables (2011), the film was simultaneously shot in Telugu and Tamil with the latter titled as Thozha. The remake rights for The Intouchables were earlier acquired by Karan Johar and Guneet Monga in May 2014, who authorised PVP Cinema to produce the adaptation of this film in regional languages, postponing their previous plans; thus making Oopiri its first remake. Principal photography began in March 2015 and ended by February 2016 taking place in Chennai, Hyderabad, Paris, Belgrade and Novi Sad. Gopi Sundar composed the film's soundtrack and score, and P. S. Vinod handled the cinematography. Madhu and Praveen K. L. edited the Telugu and Tamil versions, respectively.

Produced on a budget of  million, Oopiri and Thozha were released globally on 25 March 2016. Both received critical acclaim for the performances of the principal cast(particularly Nagarjuna and Karthi), the cinematography, and Paidipally's work in adapting the original. They were commercially successful, grossing over 1 billion. The film received two wins at the 64th Filmfare Awards South, with Best Director (Telugu) for Paidipally and Best Cinematography for P. S. Vinod. Paidipally also received a win for Best Director Award at the 6th South Indian International Movie Awards. The film is considered one of the "25 Greatest Telugu Films Of The Decade" by Film Companion.

Plot 
Vikramaditya is a wealthy entrepreneur who owns a group of businesses. In Paris, a paragliding accident leaves him a quadriplegic. To ensure his girlfriend Nandini's happiness, Vikramaditya's friend and legal adviser, Prasad, conveys a message on his behalf that he is not interested in marrying her.

Five years later, Vikramaditya leads a hopeless life with his secretary Keerthi, his cook Lakshmi, and a few servants. He and Keerthi interview candidates for a caretaker position; many seem pretentious and manipulative. Seenu, a paroled convict, applies for the job in accordance with his lawyer's (Lingam) advice; the job would prove to the court that Seenu is leading a law-abiding life, closing his case. His mother, a railway clerk, disowns Seenu as she thinks that he is a bad influence on his siblings. He is detested by his mother and his siblings.

Vikramaditya, finding Seenu honest and unpretentious, hires him. He defends his decision to Prasad, saying that Seenu is the right person for the time being since he is the only one who does not pity him. Initially reluctant, Seenu learns the extent of Vikramaditya's disability and assists him with all his needs. He is attracted to Keerthi, who rejects his advances quickly and gives him an inferiority complex.

Seenu learns that Vikramaditya has a purely epistolary relationship with a woman called Priya. Seenu encourages him to meet her, but Vikramaditya opposes it, fearing her reaction when she discovers his disability. Swathi's marriage is opposed by her lover's father, Kalidasu, who ridicules their economic status. Vikramaditya learns about this, and coerces Kalidasu (through Prasad). The marriage is arranged, and Seenu earns Swathi's respect, coming to know about this, Seenu tearfully thanked Vikram.

After celebrating his birthday, Vikramaditya becomes ill during the night and is saved by his doctors. Seenu learns about Vikramaditya's past from Prasad, and suggests a vacation in Paris. Vikramaditya agrees and he, Seenu, and Keerthi leave for Paris. Seenu keeps Vikramaditya happy and boosts his morale, which impresses Keerthi. He wagers that he will propose to Keerthi if Vikramaditya impresses Jenny, a French dancer. Despite his disability, Vikramaditya charms Jenny with his wit. Seenu is then forced to propose to Keerthi, who later accepts.

Vikramaditya meets Nandini, her husband Abhinav, and their daughter Aadhya, and Seenu tells her about Vikramaditya's accident and its aftermath. Relieved that Nandini is happy, he returns to India and his joyous attitude makes Prasad and Lakshmi happy. Later, Kanna gets in trouble with a gang, and meets Seenu at Vikramaditya's mansion. Vikramaditya, recognising Seenu's need to support his family, releases him from his obligations and suggests he may not want to push a wheelchair all his life. Although Seenu becomes a cab driver, leads a responsible life, this time Seenu's mother accepts him and Kanna, Vikramaditya is unhappy with his new caretakers and becomes a recluse.

A worried Prasad contacts Seenu, who arrives and drives Vikramaditya off in a car to Visakhapatnam (Pondicherry in Tamil version). They dress elegantly, and visit a restaurant with a beautiful ocean view. Seenu leaves moments before Priya arrives. Vikramaditya looks outside through the window and sees Seenu, who smiles at him and walks away.

Cast

Production

Development 
Karan Johar and Guneet Monga acquired the Indian remake rights to Olivier Nakache & Éric Toledano French comedy drama film, The Intouchables (2011) in May 2014. They planned a Hindi version, directed by Mohit Suri. Johar and Monga later authorised PVP Cinema to remake the film in regional languages, postponing their previous plans. Vamshi Paidipally was chosen to direct a bilingual production, entitled Oopiri in Telugu and Thozha in Tamil. Oopiri is the first Indian remake of The Intouchables. It was also the first Indian remake of a film produced by Gaumont Film Company.

N. T. Rama Rao Jr. was signed to play one of the two male leads. At Rama Rao's suggestion, Paidipally forwarded the script to actor and producer Nagarjuna for the other male lead. Nagarjuna asked the director to remove the flashback scenes, opting for a realistic version closer to the original. Paidipally agreed, and the script was reworked in two months. Production was scheduled to begin in December 2014, when Nagarjuna would be available. In an interview with Deccan Chronicle, the actor said that the film's theme would be similar to Missamma (1955). Rama Rao Jr. left the project due to scheduling conflicts with Nannaku Prematho (2016), and was replaced by Karthi in October 2014.

Gopi Sundar was signed as the film's music director, his first collaboration with Paidipally. Oopiri had two launch ceremonies: the first on 11 February 2015 in Hyderabad and the second on 15 March in Chennai. P. S. Vinod was the film's cinematographer. Paidipally worked on the screenplay, assisted by Hari and Solomon with the adaptation. Abburi Ravi wrote the dialogue for Oopiri, and Karthi asked filmmaker Raju Murugan to do the same for Thozha. Madhu and Praveen K. L. edited the Telugu and Tamil versions, respectively.

Casting 

Nagarjuna played the wheelchair-using quadriplegic in the film, and a 2.5 million customised wheelchair was imported from Sweden for the role. An assistant checked to see if the actor moved his limbs during filming, and scenes had to be re-shot a number of times. Nagarjuna found the process "extremely challenging", and his legs sometimes became numb. Oopiri was Karthi's first Telugu film, although he was popular with Telugu-speaking audiences who saw dubbed versions of his Tamil films. Rajeev Kamineni of PVP Cinema told The Hindu that Karthi was cast to combine actors who were audience favourites and had not collaborated before.

Karthi played the caretaker, reprising Omar Sy's role in the original. He called his character "terribly insensitive", but becoming refined at the end. Despite his fluency in Telugu, Karthi wanted to practice his dialogue in advance since scenes in both languages would be shot at the same time. He had to be louder in Oopiri, and used local Tamil slang in Thozha. The actor said that some changes were made in the remake, since some situations in the original "just could not work in the Indian scenario". Shruti Haasan was chosen as the female lead in January 2015. After she walked out in March, citing scheduling conflicts, she was replaced by Tamannaah. Her character, Keerthi, was modelled on the secretary and the caretaker in the original. The actress had to look corporate for the role, which she called a "bridge of sorts between the protagonists"; she was a "constant spectator to every emotion they go through".

After Haasan left the film, PVP Cinema claimed that her scheduled dates (from 10 December 2014 to 8 April 2015) were assigned for her convenience and the actress was civilly and criminally liable. The Nampally city court restricted her from agreeing to any new film and ordered a police investigation. According to Haasan's spokesperson, neither the actress nor Raaj Kamal Films International were legally notified. Haasan withdrew her defamation suit in April 2015 after R. Sarathkumar and S. Thanu intervened, and the court dismissed PVP Cinema's case.

Prakash Raj, Ali, Vivek, and Tanikella Bharani were cast in key supporting roles, with Jayasudha and Nikkita Anil playing Karthi's mother and sister. Kalpana made her Telugu-film debut in Oopiri, but she died in her sleep at age 50 during filming in Hyderabad. Anushka Shetty and Adivi Sesh made cameo appearances as a couple; the former played Nagarjuna's ex-girlfriend in the film. Gabriella Demetriades was cast in August 2015 after auditioning with five other international models in Hyderabad, and the film was her South Indian acting debut. Nora Fatehi made a special appearance in a song, and Shriya Saran had a cameo appearance.

Filming 

According to PVP Cinema's Kamineni, a substantial portion of Oopiri would be filmed abroad. Principal photography began in Chennai on 16 March 2015. Scenes with Karthi and Jayasudha were filmed in a purpose-built house set. By the time Haasan left the film, the first shooting schedule had wrapped. After completing schedules in Chennai and Hyderabad, Karthi and Tamannaah joined the film set in Dubai in May; several scenes were filmed in a rented, palatial house. Paidipally, who planned a 25-day shooting schedule in Paris and Lyon beginning in June, left to scout locations. A month-long European shooting schedule began in July in Belgrade and Novi Sad, and Oopiri was the first South Indian film made there. After Belgrade and Novi Sad, filming continued in Paris, Lyon and Ljubljana. Key scenes, including a car chase, and some songs were filmed as part of the schedule.

The car-chase scene was filmed over eight nights, due to changes in the weather. It was shot near the Eiffel Tower, which Paidipally called the "obvious choice to show the moment of triumph" in Vikramaditya's life. On 1 August, Nagarjuna tweeted that the shooting schedule would wrap in ten days. A song including Nagarjuna, Karthi, and Fatehi was filmed in November in Hyderabad. Principal photography wrapped in February 2016, and post-production commenced shortly. Thozha filming was delayed due to Nagarjuna's lack of fluency in Tamil, but at Karthi's insistence he delivered his own lines. Tamannaah found her dialogue simple and realistic and delivered her own lines in Oopiri, the first Telugu film to include her voice.

Music 
Gopi Sundar composed the film's score and seven-song soundtrack. Ramajogayya and Sirivennela Sitarama Sastry wrote the Telugu version's lyrics, and the lyrics for Thozha soundtrack were by Madhan Karky. According to Karky, all the lyrics in Oopiri except "Door Number Okati" had different meanings in Thozha, and Karthi and Paidipally wanted Thozha songs to suit the Tamil audience's sensibilities. The soundtrack of the Telugu version was unveiled on 14 February 2016 (Valentine's Day) at the Hitex Convention Centre in Hyderabad, while the Tamil version was released on 21 February 2016, at St. Bede's School in Chennai amid much fanfare. Both the albums were marketed by Times Music South, also known as Junglee Music.

The Times of India gave Oopiri soundtrack four stars, calling it a "winner on all counts" and Sunder is "increasingly becoming a force to be reckon with in [Telugu cinema]". Karthik Srinivasan, writing for The Hindu, praised Sunder's usage of solo violin pieces and chorus hooks in  Thozha "Pudhidhaa" ("Oka Life" in Oopiri). Siddharth K of Sify noted that the soundtrack of Thozha has influences of Malayalam film soundtracks in the slow-paced songs despite being designed keeping the Telugu and Tamil sensibilities in mind. He found the songs "Baby Odathey" ("Baby Aagodhu" in Telugu), "Nagarum" ("Eppudu" in Telugu), and "Eiffel Mele" ("Ayyo Ayyo" in Telugu) likeable and gave the soundtrack three stars.

Telugu version

Tamil version

Release

Theatrical 

Oopiri and Thozha were released globally on 25 March 2016, simultaneously with Batman v Superman: Dawn of Justice and Rocky Handsome.

Screening statistics 
Oopiri was released on 500 screens in Andhra Pradesh and 200 screens in Telangana; Thozha was released on nearly 400 screens in Tamil Nadu. The overseas screen count was 225. The film was also released on 120 screens in Karnataka, 70 screens in Kerala, and nearly 100 screens in North India.

Distribution 
Dil Raju distributed Oopiri in the Nizam region, paying 80 million for the rights. PVP Cinema, collaborating with others, distributed the film in Tamil Nadu, Karnataka, Kerala, and the remaining Indian markets; Tamil Nadu distribution rights cost 120 million, and SPI Cinemas distributed Thozha in the Chennai and Chengalpet markets. PVP Cinema also distributed Oopiri and Thozha overseas for 40 million.

Home media 
The digital rights of Oopiri and Thozha were purchased by YuppTV, a leading television content provider in South. The premiere of the film took place on 3 May 2016 after its theatrical run ended. The television broadcast rights were acquired by Sun TV Network; and the global television premiere of the Tamil version Thozha was held on 2 October 2016 coinciding with Gandhi Jayanti.

Reception

Critical response 

Baradwaj Rangan, writing for The Hindu, found Thozha enjoyable despite its lack of narrative finesse and called it a light, pleasant film comparable to Bangalore Days (2014). Sangeetha Devi Dundoo, also in The Hindu, gave Oopiri four stars and called it a "rare film that justifies its hype". She wrote that Nagarjuna's portrayal of Vikramaditya was "age-defying, graceful and restrained" and praised the rest of the cast, Vinod's cinematography, and Sunder's score. Pranita Jonnalagedda of The Times of India gave Oopiri four stars out of five, writing that it "sets a benchmark for adaptations in Telugu cinema" and "paves the way for more exciting genres". She praised the principal cast's performances and the film's climax.

According to Anupama Subramaniam of Deccan Chronicle, Thozha had an "alluring story" supported by "extraordinary performances, sound technical departments and rich production values". Suresh Kavirayani, also in Deccan Chronicle, found Oopiri a "beautiful and emotional journey". Both gave the film 3.5 stars out of five. Writing for India Today, Kirubhakar Purushothaman also gave the film 3.5 stars out of five, calling it a decent remake which "retains the soul of the original" with "the right cast and the perfect team". Karthik Keramalu of News18 also gave Oopiri 3.5 stars out of five. Keramalu called it the best of Paidipally's career so far and praised the principal cast's performances.

S. Saraswathi of Rediff.com gave Thozha three stars out of five, praising the film's screenplay, visuals, and performances. Sify also gave the film three stars out of five and called it a "breezy feel good ride"; its reviewer praised its performances and visuals, but criticised its length. Gautaman Bhaskaran, writing for the Hindustan Times, gave Thozha 2.5 stars out of five; Bhaskaran found the film "[u]nduly verbose" and wrote that it "loses its sense of male bonding—particularly after it veers into love stories".

Box office 
Trade analyst Taran Adarsh tweeted that Oopiri opened in 14th place at the U.S. box office, an "enviable achievement", and the film earned $76,804 from its previews. It grossed $210,233 on its first day, its earnings increasing by 70.95 percent the second day—according to Adarsh, rare for an Indian film in the U.S. During its first weekend, Oopiri grossed $646,273 (43.2 million). According to trade analyst Sreedhar Pillai, Thozha netted 81.5 million (with a distributor share of 48 million) at the Tamil Nadu box office and earned 11.4 million in Chennai over a three-day period. The film grossed 290 million globally over its first weekend (with a distributor share of about 200 million), a 40-percent return on distributor investment.

Oopiri earned $1,005,739 (66.7 million) in four days, the 17th Telugu film to cross the million-dollar mark in the United States. It grossed $1,167,611 (77.3 million) over eight days, and became the 11th-highest-grossing Telugu film in the U.S. In ten days, Oopiri and Thozha grossed 233 million and 173 million in Andhra Pradesh, Telangana, and Tamil Nadu respectively. It earned $1,385,179 (91.5 million) in ten days at the U.S. box office to become the eighth-highest-grossing Telugu film of all time in that country. By the end of the third weekend, Oopiri and Thozha had grossed 847.5 million and were declared commercially successful.

By the end of its third week, Oopiri grossed more than $1.5 million and became the fourth-highest-grossing Telugu film of all time in the U.S. It earned $1,559,065 (103.7 million) in 24 days and $1,567,151 (104.5 million) in 31 days in that country. During their full runs, both versions grossed over 1 billion and netted about 630 million.

Accolades

Legacy 
Inspired by the film, paraplegic television personality Sujatha Barla established the Challengers on Wheels-Celebrating Life community for physically disabled people in April 2016. Judge G. Neelima took 60 underprivileged female students in Balasadan, Warangal to a special screening of Oopiri on the eve of Ugadi.

See also 
 List of multilingual Indian films
 Pan-Indian film
 List of longest films in India

Notes

References

External links 
 

2016 films
Films directed by Vamsi Paidipally
Films about paraplegics or quadriplegics
Films scored by Gopi Sundar
Indian comedy-drama films
2016 comedy-drama films
Films set in Paris
Films set in Hyderabad, India
Films set in Chennai
Indian remakes of French films
Indian multilingual films
Films shot in France
Films shot in Paris
2010s Telugu-language films
2010s Tamil-language films
Films shot in Serbia
Films shot in Dubai
Films shot in Hyderabad, India
Films shot in Slovenia
Films about disability in India
Films shot in Chennai
Films shot at Ramoji Film City
2016 multilingual films
Films directed by Vamshi Paidipally
Films shot in Lyon